The Golden Stallion is a 1927 American silent Western film serial produced by Nat Levine's Mascot Pictures (the first serial produced by Mascot) and directed by Harry S. Webb.

Plot
Two men search for a fabled gold mine. The clue to the mine's location is branded on the neck of a wild horse, "White Fury", and the men battle each other to capture the horse first.

Cast
 Maurice Bennett Flynn as Wynne Randall
 Joe Bonomo as Ewart Garth
 Jay J. Bryan as Black Eagle
 Ann Small as Watona
 White Fury the Horse as The Golden Stallion
 Bert De Marc
 Billy Franey
 Tom London as Jules La Roux
 Molly Malone as Joan Forythe
 Burr McIntosh as Elmer Kendall
 Josef Swickard as John Forsythe

References

External links
 

1927 films
American silent serial films
1927 Western (genre) films
American black-and-white films
Mascot Pictures film serials
Films directed by Harry S. Webb
Films produced by Nat Levine
Silent American Western (genre) films
1920s American films
1920s English-language films